A.T. Still University - School of Osteopathic Medicine in Arizona (ATSU-SOMA) is a private medical school in Mesa, Arizona. It was established in 2007 as the Arizona campus of A.T. Still University. A.T. Still University (ATSU) is the original founding institution of osteopathic healthcare, established in 1892 by Andrew Taylor Still in Kirksville, Missouri.

SOMA is accredited by the Commission on Osteopathic College Accreditation (COCA) of the American Osteopathic Association (AOA).

Campus

The medical program operates out of a  building on the  campus of A.T. Still University in Mesa. The campus is the anchor of the Arizona Health & Technology Park, a  education, healthcare, and technology triangle owned by ATSU and Vanguard Health Systems. The master plan for the new park includes hospitals, long-term care facilities, professional offices, and product development research facilities.

The campus is also home to the ATSU-Arizona School of Health Sciences, ATSU-Arizona School of Dentistry and Oral Health, and the  East Valley Family YMCA.

Academics
The curriculum at ATSU-SOMA is unique in that all of the clinical education is based at one of twelve community health centers throughout the country.

Training
ATSU-SOMA uses the Clinical Presentation Educational Model which teaches that there are about 120 different ways that a patient can present themself to a physician.  The teaching method was based on a method developed in 1994 by the University of Calgary.  Basic sciences are coupled with clinical sciences so that the students have a more comprehensive and practical foundation for each medical discipline. The curriculum design emphasizes clinical competencies which allows students to enter residency programs with greater experience with chronic disease than students educated in the majority of tertiary care-oriented academic health centers.

Community Health Center locations
ATSU-SOMA is unique in that the first year is spent at the Mesa campus and the last three years at one of many community health centers.  As of 2021, ATSU-SOMA offers 16 community health center opportunities in such locations as (Alphabetically, by State):

 ARIZONA
North Country Healthcare – Flagstaff, Arizona
Adelante Healthcare – Phoenix, Arizona
 El Rio Community Health Center – Tucson, Arizona
CALIFORNIA
Community Health Center of the Central Coast, Inc – Santa Maria, California
San Ysidro Health Center – San Ysidro, California
Family Healthcare Network – Tulare County, California
HAWAII
Waianae Coast Comprehensive Health Center – Wai'anae, Oahu, Hawaii
ILLINOIS
Southern Illinois Healthcare Foundation – Centreville, Illinois
Near North Health Service Corporation – Chicago, Illinois
NEW YORK
Sunset Park Family Health Center – Brooklyn, New York
OHIO
HealthSource of Ohio – Mt Orab, Ohio
OREGON
Northwest Regional Primary Care Association – Portland, Oregon
PENNSYLVANIA
The Wright Center for Community Health – Scranton, Pennsylvania
SOUTH CAROLINA
Beaufort-Jasper-Hampton Comprehensive Health Services – Ridgeland, South Carolina
TEXAS
North Central Texas Community Health Care Center – Witchita Falls, Texas
WASHINGTON
Health Point (previously Community Health Centers of King County) – Suburban Seattle, Washington

See also 

 A.T. Still University
 List of medical schools in the United States

References

External links
 

A. T. Still University
Osteopathic medical schools in the United States
Medical schools in Arizona
Education in Mesa, Arizona
Universities and colleges in Maricopa County, Arizona

Educational institutions established in 2007
2007 establishments in Arizona